Palangan, also known as Patagān, Patakān, and Tangān, is a Kurdish village in Kurdistan Province, Iran. Its population was 821, with 194 families, in the 2006 Iranian census. There is a site near the village that contains the ruins of an ancient fort.

References

External links

Towns and villages in Kamyaran County
Kurdish settlements in Kurdistan Province